Maciu Samaidrawa Dunadamu (born 14 June 1986) is a Fijian footballer, who currently plays for Savusavu in the Fiji Senior League.

Career 
Dunadamu started his soccer career in the Labasa Sangam Primary School. After graduating, he left Labasa and joined tertiary studies in the University of the South Pacific. He played during this time for Suva F.C. In the Winter of 2006/2007 he returned to Labasa F.C. and won with the club the CVC AND League Title in 2007 and 2008. After his second season signed in the Spring of 2009 with Ba F.C., before joined on 6 January 2010 to Navua F.C. After just one season returned to his homeclub Labasa and played six months for them. In Summer 2011 signed than for Papua New Guinea club Hekari United. After two seasons left Hekari and returned to Fiji, to sign with his former club Ba F.C.

International 
He has played in four World Cup qualifying matches and in four OFC Nations Cups for Fiji, scoring one goal against Vanuatu.

References

1986 births
Living people
Fijian footballers
Hekari United players
People from Labasa
I-Taukei Fijian people
Fiji international footballers
Suva F.C. players
Labasa F.C. players
Navua F.C. players
Ba F.C. players
2008 OFC Nations Cup players
2012 OFC Nations Cup players
Association football forwards
Fijian beach soccer players
University of the South Pacific alumni